"This Little Girl" is a song written by Bruce Springsteen. A version by Gary U.S. Bonds was listed on music charts in 1981.

History
"This Little Girl" was written by Bruce Springsteen and has its origins in the 1978 outtake "Ain't Good Enough For You" from the Darkness on the Edge of Town sessions. The outtake version was eventually released on Springsteen's The Promise in 2010.

The song was notably recorded by Gary U.S. Bonds for his album, Dedication. It was the first of two single releases from the album. The recording contains an organ and a riff. During production, Bob Clearmountain remixed Bonds's recording. Clarence Clemons performed a saxophone for the recording.

Bonds's version became a hit in spring 1981, reaching number eleven in the US Billboard Hot 100 and also charting well in Canada and New Zealand. It peaked at number 43 in the UK Singles Chart.

Bonds performed the song as part of his guest appearance at Bruce Springsteen's 1981 New Jersey live concert.

As reported by Casey Kasem on the American Top 40 program of June 20, 1981, the song was born of a collaboration between Bonds and Springsteen after the two spent a few hours together commiserating about their stalled careers. As a thank-you gift for contributing to the song, Bonds gave Springsteen a 1963 Chevrolet Impala.

Dion DiMucci's same-titled Hot 100 #21 record from late May 1963 bears no resemblance.

Chart history

Weekly charts

Year-end charts

References

External links
 Lyrics of this song
 

Gary U.S. Bonds songs
1981 singles
1981 songs
Songs written by Bruce Springsteen
EMI America Records singles